James Lafazanos (born August 9, 1976) is a Canadian actor most noted for playing the lead male Wraith character in Stargate Atlantis seasons 12.

Personal life
Lafazanos was born in Alliston, Ontario, Canada.

Filmography

References

External links

1976 births
Living people
Canadian male film actors
Canadian male television actors
Male actors from Ontario